The 1998 Hel van het Mergelland was the 26th edition of the Volta Limburg Classic cycle race and was held on 4 April 1998. The race started and finished in Eijsden. The race was won by Raymond Meijs.

General classification

References

1998
1998 in road cycling
1998 in Dutch sport